Myelois is a genus of small moths belonging to the family Pyralidae. They are found in western Eurasia and adjacent regions such as the Maghreb.

Species of Myelois include:
 Myelois albistriga Erschoff, 1874
 Myelois cinctipalpella Christoph, 1877
 Myelois circumvoluta (Fourcroy, 1785) – thistle ermine
 Myelois cribratella Zeller, 1847
 Myelois echinopisella Chrétien, 1911
 Myelois famula Zeller, 1881
 Myelois fuscicostella Mann, 1861
 Myelois multiflorella Ragonot, 1887
 Myelois mystica Roesler, 1988
 Myelois osseella Ragonot, 1887
 Myelois ossicolor Ragonot, 1893
 Myelois pluripunctella Ragonot, 1887
 Myelois pollinella Christoph, 1877
 Myelois urbicella Erschoff, 1874
 Myelois vestaliella Erschoff, 1874

Formerly included here were related genera like Apomyelois. The genus Kyra is sometimes listed as a junior synonym of Myelois, but its type species is usually now placed in Eurhodope (as E. cirrigerella).

Footnotes

References
 
 Fauna Europaea (2011): Eurhodope cirrigerella. Version 2.4, 27 January 2011. Retrieved 22 December 2011.
 

Phycitini
Pyralidae genera